Lake Clifton may refer to:
 Lake Clifton, Western Australia
 A former reservoir near Clifton Park, Baltimore
 Lake Clifton Eastern High School in Clifton Park